Trybała is a Polish surname. Notable people with the surname include:

 Marzena Trybała (born 1950), Polish actress

See also
 Trabala
 

Polish-language surnames